Meally is an unincorporated community in Johnson County, Kentucky, United States. The community's ZIP code is 41234. Meally is located at an elevation of 620 feet (189 m).

References

Unincorporated communities in Johnson County, Kentucky
Unincorporated communities in Kentucky